Leonard Roy Jordan (24 January 1920 – 6 November 2014) was a New Zealand rugby league footballer. A , Jordan represented Auckland at a provincial level, and was a member of the New Zealand national team from 1946 to 1949. He played 29 matches for the Kiwis, including seven test matches. In the 1970s, his son Chris also played international league for New Zealand.

He was a Northcote Tigers junior.

References

1920 births
2014 deaths
New Zealand rugby league players
New Zealand national rugby league team players
Auckland rugby league team players
Ponsonby Ponies players
Rugby league centres
Northcote Tigers players